Camptopteroides verrucosa is a species of fairyfly (family Mymaridae).

References

Mymaridae
Insects described in 1989